Marie Rader (born June 10, 1941) is a former Republican member of the Kentucky House of Representatives. She has served in the Kentucky House from 1997 until December 2017.

Education 
Rader attended Berea College.

Career 
In 2017, Rader announced that she was resigning from her position in the Kentucky House due to her health. At the time, she chaired the House Committee on Transportation and was a member of the Natural Resources and Energy Committee.

Elections

2014 election 
In the newly redrawn 89th district that now consist of Northern Laurel County, Southern Madison County, and Jackson County; Marie Rader will face Michael Bryant of London, KY and Gerardo Serrano of Tyner, KY in the Republican Primary. The winner will face Educator Joey Jayson Taylor II in the General Election on November 4, 2014. Taylor automatically clinched the Democratic Nomination because he is unopposed in the Democratic primary on May 20, 2014. This race has been rated in the Top 10, State House races in 2014 by the CN2 News Network.

2016 election 
In 2016, Rader ran uncontested for the 89th district.

References

1941 births
Living people
Republican Party members of the Kentucky House of Representatives
Berea College alumni
21st-century American politicians
20th-century American politicians
20th-century American women politicians
21st-century American women politicians
Women state legislators in Kentucky